Ideopsis similis, the Ceylon blue glassy tiger, is a butterfly found in Asia, including Sri Lanka, India and Taiwan, that belongs to the subfamily Danainae (crows and tigers), in the family Nymphalidae (brush-footed butterflies).

See also
List of butterflies of India (Nymphalidae)

Ideopsis
Butterflies described in 1758
Taxa named by Carl Linnaeus
Butterflies of Asia
Butterflies of Indochina